Ali Arsalan Kazmi (born 31 October 1981), is a Pakistani-Canadian actor, director and producer.

He appears in English, Hindi, Urdu and Punjabi language films and television series.

Apart from acting he has also worked as a host, director, producer and model.

Early life and career 
Kazmi was born to the actor Rahat Kazmi and Sahira Kazmi (née Ansari), a well-known TV director, producer and actress who's herself the daughter of the late Indian film actor Shyam, on 31 October 1981 in Karachi, Pakistan. He began his career as a child actor in 1995 TV series Zikr Hai Kai Saal Ka on PTV Home and then continued playing supporting or minor roles in television which includes Manzil (2006). After completing his studies from Karachi, he moved to Canada and began acting and modeling there by appearing in TV series, commercials and plays. He also worked at China Syndrome Productions as a director and producer. One of his initial major roles was as a villain in the film The Dependables (2014). He also played a negative role in Mehreen Jabbar's Jackson Heights which gave him more popularity in Pakistan.

In 2015, he starred in two commercially successful films, Rohit Jugraj Chauhan's Sardaar Ji (2015) and Deepa Mehta's Beeba Boys (2015) with Sarah Allen, Randeep Hooda and Gulshan Grover. Kazmi has also appeared in the short film Coffee at Laundromat (2015) for which he has won Best Actor in a Short Film award at the World Music & Independent Film Festival 2016.

He also appeared in Liam Neeson's short-lived TV series Taken (2016). "I play Marzoki, a fast talking, sharp, quirky analyst", said Kazmi in an interview regarding Taken. He appeared in Mehreen Jabbar's Dobara Phir Se (2016) and the animated film The Breadwinner (2017) produced by Angelina Jolie.

Ali was also signed to appear in Ajay Devgan's Shivaay. But due to not getting permission to shoot in Canada where Kazmi is based, some changes were made in the script and his role was removed. He is currently playing the role of Abid in Tu Ishq Hai.

Kazmi's upcoming project is Umro Ayyar-A New Beginning is expected to be released in 2022 , directed by Azfar Jafri under the banner of VR Chili Production. Umro Ayyar is an action thriller movie based on the revival of Persian legend of 90's.

The other cast of Umro Ayyar is Usman Mukhtar, Sanam Saeed, Faran Tahir, Adnan Siddiqui & more.

Personal life 
Kazmi married his high school sweetheart Alizeh Khorasanee, whom he knew since the age of 12. They married in Karachi and settled in Toronto. They have two sons.

Kazmi speaks English, Urdu, Punjabi, Persian, Pashto, basic French and Arabic.

Filmography

Film

Television

Producer
Under the banner of Big Bang Entertainment.

 2013: Meri Beti - ARY Digital
 2014: Koi Nahi Apna - Ary Digital
 2014: Dusri Bivi - ARY Digital
 2014: Bahu Begum - ARY Digital
 2014: Soutan - ARY Digital 
 2015: Rang Laaga - ARY Digital
 2015: Mere Jeevan Saathi - ARY Digital
 2015: Begunaah - ARY Digital
 2016: Be Aib - Urdu 1
 2016: Yeh Ishq - ARY Digital
 2016: Waada - ARY Digital
 2016: Muqabil - ARY Digital
 2016: Be Qasoor - ARY Digital
 2016: Andaaz-e-Sitam - Urdu 1
 2016: Haya Ke Rang - ARY Zindagi
 2016: Naimat - ARY Digital
 2016: Tum Yaad Aaye - ARY Digital
 2016: Aap Ke Liye - ARY Digital
 2016: Saheliyan - ARY Digital
 2016: Mere Baba ki Ounchi Haveli - ARY Zindagi
 2016: Teri Chah Mein - ARY Digital
 2016: Mera Yaar Miladay - ARY Digital
 2016: Socha Na Tha - ARY Digital
 2016: Dil Haari - ARY Digital
 2016: Shehzada Saleem - ARY Digital
 2017: Mubarak Ho Beti Hui Hai - ARY Digital
 2017: Zaakham - ARY Digital
 2017: Bilqees Urf Bitto - Urdu 1
 2017: Bachay Baraye Farokht - Urdu 1
 2017: Teri Raza - ARY Digital
 2017: Aisi Hai Tanhai - ARY Digital
 2018: Meri Guriya - ARY Digital
 2018: Nibah - ARY Digital
 2018: Babban Khala Ki Betiyan - ARY Digital
 2018: Badbakhti - ARY Zindagi
 2018: Balaa - ARY Digital
 2018: Khudparast - ARY Digital
 2018: Visaal - ARY Digital
 2019: Cheekh - ARY Digital
 2019: Bandish - ARY Digital

Video games

Theatre

Awards 

|-
| style="text-align:center;"| 2016
| rowspan="1" style="text-align:center;"| Ali Kazmi
| Best Actor in a Short Film at World Music & Independent Film Festival
|

References

External links 

Living people
1981 births
Canadian male actors of Pakistani descent
Canadian music video directors
Canadian television directors
Canadian male models
Canadian television producers
Canadian male television actors
Canadian male film actors
Canadian male voice actors
Pakistani emigrants to Canada
Naturalized citizens of Canada
Male actors from Karachi
Pakistani people of Indian descent